Culmer may refer to:

Places
 Culmer (Metrorail station), in Miami 

People
 John Culmer (1891–1963), Miami minister and civil rights leader 
 Richard Culmer (1597–1662), may have been the eldest son of Sir Henry Culmer (c. 1574–1633), the first Baron Culmer
 Wil Culmer (born 1957), Major League Baseball player for the Cleveland Indians

Other
 Culmer White, 19th-century lifeboat of the Isle of Thanet